I18 may refer to:

 , a 1939 River-class destroyer that served in the Royal Canadian Navy
 , a 1931 C-class destroyer of the Royal Navy
 , a 1939 Type C submarine of the Imperial Japanese Navy
Västmanland Regiment (1816–1927), a Swedish Army infantry regiment
Gotland Infantry Regiment (1928–1963), a Swedish Army infantry regiment

Ship disambiguation pages